The Cacharel Caracas Open was a men's  tennis tournament founded as the Altamira International, also known as the  Altamira International Invitation in 1956. The tournament was played annually at the Altamira Tennis Club, Miranda, Caracas, Venezuela usually in mid-March initially as part of the ILTF Caribbean Circuit.  

The women's tournament ended in 1970 and the mens event continued. From 1975 to 1976 the men's editions were known as the Caracas WCT tournament before it was briefly discontinued in 1982 the tournament was revived under a new name before it was abolished in 1983.

History
In 1927 the Venezuelan International Tennis Assoction was established and established a Venezuelan Lawn Tennis Championships at the first Altamira Tennis Club. In 1946 the Altamira Tennis Club was formally created. In 1956 the Altamira International, also known as the Altamira International Invitation tournament was established at Altamira Tennis Club, Caracas, Venezuela. 

The Atamira International was organized as part of a spring (March to May) Caribbean Circuit which included tournaments in Jamaica (Kingston International Invitation), Puerto Rico (Caribe Hilton Championships), Trinidad and Tobago (Trinidad International) and Colombia, Colombia International (Ciudad de Barranquilla). the tournament attracted the top players of the day.

In 1970 the women's event was discontinued. The tournament continued under brand name Altamira International until 1974. Between 1975 and 1976 the mens event became part of the WCT Circuit and was known as the Caracas WCT tournament. In 1977 the tournament was not held for five years when it was revived and rebranded in 1982 as the Caracas Open played at the same venue until 1983.

Finals

Men's singles
(incomplete roll)

Men's Doubles

Women's Singles
(incomplete roll)

Location and venue
The Altimira Tennis Club was founded in 1946 by the Venezuelan International Tennis Association (f.1927) who built the club and is headquartered there. Today the club consists on 11 tennis courts.

Event statistics
 Most men's titles:  Rod Laver &  Raúl Ramírez (3)
 Most women's titles:  Maria Bueno (4)

References

External links
ITF Vault
ITF Vault

Grand Prix tennis circuit
Defunct tennis tournaments in Venezuela
Tennis tournaments in Venezuela
Recurring sporting events established in 1956
Recurring sporting events disestablished in 1983
Sport in Caracas
1956 establishments in Venezuela
1983 disestablishments in Venezuela
Hard court tennis tournaments